Ezine is a town in Çanakkale Province in the Marmara Region of Turkey. It is the seat of Ezine District. Its population is 15,408. Ezine is famous for its white cheese, made with cow, goat or sheep milk and called Ezine Peyniri.

References

External links
 Road map of Ezine and environs
 Various images and map of Ezine district

Populated places in Çanakkale Province
Ezine District
Towns in Turkey